Aure (also called Sykkylven) is the administrative center of Sykkylven Municipality in Møre og Romsdal county, Norway. The village is located along the eastern shore of the Sykkylvsfjorden.

It's the largest urban area in the municipality.

Sykkylven Church is located in this village.  The village is home to various types of industry, especially furniture building, woodworking, and mechanical engineering. The Furniture Museum, part of the Sunnmøre Museum Foundation, is located in Aure.

References

Villages in Møre og Romsdal
Sykkylven